Snoopified - The Best of Snoop Dogg is the third greatest hits album by Snoop Dogg released in 2005. It contains mostly singles, charted and well-known songs from his early albums released by No Limit and Priority Records. It has two additional tracks, "Hell Yeah" (Stone Cold Steve Austin Theme) from the WWF Aggression compilation (2000) and "Ride On" from the soundtrack Caught Up (1998).

Reception

The album reached the 50th spot on the UK Top 75 Album chart, falling back the following week and failed to stay in the 75 for the third week. It nearly sold 10,800 copies and ranked #121 on the Billboard 200. It has sold over 119,747 copies. Although the album excludes tracks from Snoop's landmark Doggystyle record, it provides popular songs from his four albums released between 1998 and 2002.

Allmusic gave the album 4 stars out of 5 and said, "A lot of people — fans and haters alike — declared Snoop's career dead once the disastrous first No Limit album came out, so the MC himself must feel at least a little vindicated that this set exists."

Track listing

Chart performance

Weekly charts

References

2005 greatest hits albums
Albums produced by Ant Banks
Albums produced by Battlecat (producer)
Albums produced by DJ Premier
Albums produced by Dr. Dre
Albums produced by the Neptunes
Albums produced by Timbaland
Albums produced by DJ Quik
Snoop Dogg compilation albums
Priority Records compilation albums
Gangsta rap compilation albums
G-funk compilation albums